The TB2L 2015–16 season of the Turkish Basketball Second League, which is the third-tier level league of the basketball league club system in Turkey.

Regular season

Group A

Group B

Turkish Basketball Second League